Shahzada Mirza Shah Abbas Bahadur (1845 – 25 December 1910) was a prince of the Mughal Kingdom, the son of Emperor Bahadur Shah II, the last Emperor of India, by his wife Mubarak-un-Nissa Khanum Begum.

He was a younger brother of Prince Mirza Mughal and former Crown Princes Mirza Dara Bakht, Mirza Jawan Bakht, and Mirza Fath-ul-Mulk Bahadur. In 1858, the Mughal Era officially came to an end, signifying the end of a 332-year rule. In 1877, the title Emperor of India was taken by the British Royal Family starting with Queen Victoria.

Sources

1845 births
1910 deaths
Mughal princes
People from Delhi